The 2010 FINA Men's Water Polo World League was the ninth edition of the annual event, organised by the world's governing body in aquatics, the FINA. After a preliminary round organized by continent, the Super Final was held in Niš, Serbia from July 13–18, 2010. Serbia won this year's edition after a final victory over Montenegro 14–12.

Preliminary round

Africa

The African tournament was held in Tunis, Tunisia from June 17–20. One team from the group of four advanced.

June 17

June 18

June 19

June 20

Americas
The American tournament was held in Los Alamitos, California, United States from May 5–8. One team from the group of three advanced.

May 5

May 6

May 7

May 8

Asia/Oceania
 
The Asia and Oceania region was feature a two-legged tournament, in Osaka, Japan (May 19–23) and Tianjin, China (May 26–30). The four teams was play a round robin in each location, with the results from both legs combined. The top two teams from the group of six advanced.

May 19

May 20

May 21

May 22

May 23

May 26

May 27

May 28

May 29

May 30

Europe

Europe is divided into three groups of four teams, with qualifying spots for the winner of each group as well as Super Final host Serbia. Rather than the condensed tournament style competition of the other continents, the European matches was played in a home-and-away format over five months.

Group A

November 17

December 8

January 26

February 23

March 16

April 28

June 1

Group B

November 17

December 8

January 26

February 23

March 16

June 22

July 3

Group C

November 17

December 8

January 26

February 23

March 16

April 20

April 27

Super Final

The Super Final was held in Niš, Serbia from July 13–18.

Group 1

July 13

July 14

July 15

Group 2

July 13

July 14

July 15

Quarter-finals
July 16

Medal round

5th–8th places

Final ranking

Awards

References

External links
FINA Official website – Water Polo World League

2010
W
W
Sport in Niš
International water polo competitions hosted by Serbia